The 2009 Memorial Cup was a four-team round-robin format ice hockey tournament played during May 2009 in Rimouski, Quebec.  It was the 91st annual Memorial Cup competition and determined the major junior ice hockey champion of the Canadian Hockey League (CHL). The Quebec Major Junior Hockey League announced on April 3, 2008, that the Rimouski Océanic were chosen to host the event at the Colisée de Rimouski. Other participants include the Windsor Spitfires, champions of the Ontario Hockey League, the Drummondville Voltigeurs, champions of the Quebec Major Junior Hockey League, and the Kelowna Rockets, champions of the Western Hockey League.

Five other QMJHL teams submitted a bid to host the event, including the Chicoutimi Saguenéens, Halifax Mooseheads, Lewiston Maineiacs, Shawinigan Cataractes, and the St. John's Fog Devils. The Maineiacs bid partnered with the American Hockey League's Portland Pirates, with a plan to host the event in Portland's Cumberland County Civic Center. The QMJHL announced a five-member independent selection committee to evaluate the bids, headed by former New Brunswick Premier Bernard Lord.

The tournament began on May 15, 2009 with Kelowna beating Rimouski 4–1. Windsor defeated Rimouski in the tiebreaker and Drummondville in the semifinal, becoming just the second team since the current Memorial Cup tournament format was adopted in 1983 to reach the final after losing its first two games. Windsor then captured the Memorial Cup, defeating Kelowna 4–1 on May 24, 2009, becoming the first team in Memorial Cup history to win the tournament after starting 0–2, and also the first to win coming out of the tiebreaker.

Tournament
All times listed are Eastern Daylight Time (UTC−4).

Round robin

Results

Tiebreaker

Semifinal

Final

Statistical leaders

Skaters

These are the top skaters based on points. If the list exceeds ten skaters because of a tie in points, all of the tied skaters are shown.

GP = Games played; G = Goals; A = Assists; Pts = Points; PIM = Penalty minutes

Goaltending

This is a combined table of the top goaltenders based on goals against average and save percentage with at least sixty minutes played. The table is sorted by GAA.

GP = Games played; W = Wins; L = Losses; SA = Shots against; GA = Goals against; GAA = Goals against average; SV% = Save percentage; SO = Shutouts; TOI = Time on ice (minutes:seconds)

Tournament awards

Rosters

Road to the Cup

OHL playoffs

QMJHL playoffs

WHL playoffs

References

External links
 Memorial Cup
 Canadian Hockey League

Memorial Cup tournaments
Memorial Cup 2009
Mem